Mikhail Yemtsev (Russian: Михаил Тихонович Емцев, June 3, 1930 – August 25, 2003) - Soviet and Russian science fiction writer who worked mostly in collaboration with Yeremey Parnov.

Collaborative works with Yeremey Parnov

Collected stories
 ; English translation: The Pale Neptune Equation
 
 
 
 
 

Novels
 ; English translation: World Soul

References

External links

Russian science fiction writers
Soviet science fiction writers
Soviet male writers
20th-century Russian male writers
1930 births
2003 deaths
Writers from Kherson